Charlotte Baldwin (1778–1856) was an American stage actress and theatre manager.

Baldwin was one of the earliest female theatre managers in the United States. She was the founder and manager of the City Theatre, Warren Street, Broadway in 1822, and was the first woman in the USA who founded her own theatre rather than inheriting one. She was a popular actor as old women in comedies, notably at the Park Theatre, where she was engaged in 1816.

See also
 Charlotte Wrighten Placide 
 Amelia Holman Gilfert

References

1778 births
1856 deaths
19th-century American actresses
American stage actresses
19th-century theatre managers
Women theatre managers and producers
19th-century American businesswomen
19th-century American businesspeople